Matthew Timothy Kassel (born October 30, 1989) is a retired American soccer player and current color commentator for Bethlehem Steel FC in the USL.

Career

College and amateur
Kassel attended Bridgewater-Raritan High School. He began his career with New York Red Bulls' youth academy, and was heavily recruited going into college, being ranked as the ninth best high school recruit in the nation by the magazine ESPN RISE. After receiving interest from New York Red Bulls Kassel decided to attend the University of Maryland. In his first year at Maryland Kassel helped his side capture the 2008 Division I Men's College Cup.

In January 2009, he declined to sign a contract from New York Red Bulls. Instead, he decided to stay with the University of Maryland soccer team. In his three years at the University of Maryland Kassell appeared in 68 matches and scored 11 goals and recorded 24 assists. During his time in college he remained with the New York Red Bulls Academy and was a member of the New York Red Bull NPSL squad.

Professional
In January 2011 Kassel signed with New York Red Bulls, becoming the third Home Grown player to join the senior roster.
He made his MLS debut on 28 May 2011, in a 1–1 tie with Vancouver Whitecaps FC. On June 28, 2011 Kassel started his first match for New York playing the full 90 in a 2–1 victory over FC New York in the US Open Cup.

Kassel was waived by New York on February 17, 2012. In his first season with the Pittsburgh Riverhounds after signing with the team in April 2012, he scored 6 goals in 18 games and earned 2nd Team USL PRO All-League honors.

After spending Spring Training as a trialist, Kassel signed with the Philadelphia Union on March 5, 2013.

Kassel was released by Philadelphia before the start of their 2014 season and later signed with USL Pro's Arizona United.

International
Kassel has played for the United States at several youth team levels, including Under 15, Under 18 and Under 20. He played in all three games at the Under 18 Lisbon Tournament in May 2007. In April 2008, Kassel was called up for the Under 20 team for a week-long training camp in England and three games against Premier League reserve teams.

Broadcasting
After a four-year professional career, Kassel retired from playing. Since 2016, Kassel has been brought on as the color commentator for the newly formed Bethlehem Steel FC; USL affiliate of his former club, Philadelphia Union.

Career statistics

Club

Honors

University of Maryland
 NCAA Men's Division I Soccer Championship (1): 2008

Individual
 USL Pro - 2nd Team All-League (1): 2012

References

External links
 
 Maryland bio

1989 births
Living people
American soccer players
Bridgewater-Raritan High School alumni
Maryland Terrapins men's soccer players
New York Red Bulls U-23 players
New York Red Bulls players
Pittsburgh Riverhounds SC players
Philadelphia Union players
Phoenix Rising FC players
Association football midfielders
People from Bridgewater Township, New Jersey
Sportspeople from Somerset County, New Jersey
Soccer players from New Jersey
Major League Soccer players
USL Championship players
United States men's youth international soccer players
All-American men's college soccer players
Homegrown Players (MLS)